60 Minutes of Funk, Volume IV: The Mixtape is a mixtape by American DJ Funkmaster Flex. It was released on December 5, 2000 via Loud Records, serving as a sequel to 1998 The Mix Tape Volume III: 60 Minutes of Funk (The Final Chapter) and the fourth installment in his 60 Minute of Funk mixtape series.

This project was a departure from Flex's previous Mix Tape releases, which consisted of freestyles mixed with previously released songs. This, however, was mostly made up of original songs with original production with Funkmaster Flex providing the DJ mix.

Singles
Two singles made it to the Billboard charts, "Do You", which featured DMX, was the most successful of the two, reaching 92 on the Billboard Hot 100. Faith Evans's "Goodlife" became hit on both the R&B and rap charts.

Commercial performance
60 Minutes of Funk, Volume IV: The Mixtape was a success, peaking at 26 on the Billboard 200 and becoming Funk Flex's fourth consecutive album to earn a gold certification from the Recording Industry Association of America. To date this remains the final entry in the 60 Minute of Funk mixtape series, a fifth installment was planned for release on January 15, 2002, however the album's release was cancelled.

Track listing

Notes
 signifies a co-producer.

Sample credits
Track 2 contains elements from "Jungle Boogie", written by Claydes Charles Smith, Dennis Thomas, Donald Boyce, George Melvin Brown, Richard Westfield, Robert Earl Bell, Robert Spike Mickens and Ronald Bell, and performed by Kool & the Gang
Track 4 contains elements from "Sandino", written and performed by Jerry Goldsmith
Track 6 contains elements from "I Didn't Mean To", written by John Owens, and performed by Casual
Track 14 contains elements from "Seventh Heaven", written by Tami Lester Smith, and performed by Gwen Guthrie

Charts

Weekly charts

Year-end charts

Certifications

References

External links

Sequel albums
2000 mixtape albums
Loud Records albums
Funkmaster Flex albums
Albums produced by Nottz
Albums produced by Eminem
Albums produced by KayGee
Albums produced by DJ Paul
Albums produced by Juicy J
Albums produced by Swizz Beatz
Albums produced by Jermaine Dupri
Albums produced by Bryan-Michael Cox